Aleksei Valeryevich Nikitin (born 27 January 1992) is a Russian football centre-back who plays for Bosnian club Tuzla City.

Club career
He made his debut in the Russian Football National League for FC Yenisey Krasnoyarsk on 7 April 2012 in a game against FC SKA-Energiya Khabarovsk. He signed with FC Ufa in 2015.

On 18 June 2022, Nikitin moved to FC Khimki.

On 17 February 2023, Nikitin signed with Tuzla City in Bosnia and Herzegovina until the end of the season.

Career statistics

References

External links
 
 

1992 births
Footballers from Moscow
Living people
Russian footballers
Russia youth international footballers
Russia under-21 international footballers
Association football defenders
PFC CSKA Moscow players
FC Yenisey Krasnoyarsk players
FC Amkar Perm players
FC Ufa players
FC Khimki players
FK Tuzla City players
Russian Premier League players
Russian First League players
Russian expatriate footballers
Expatriate footballers in Bosnia and Herzegovina
Russian expatriate sportspeople in Bosnia and Herzegovina